North Jackson USD 335 is a unified school district headquartered about four miles north of Holton, Kansas, United States.  The district includes the communities of Circleville, Netawaka, Soldier, Whiting, and nearby rural areas.  The high school is notable for having previously been an Atlas nuclear missile site.

History 

The site of the current high school previous housed a command center and one of the nine Atlas nuclear missiles from 1961 until its closure in 1964 and then sat empty for five years.  A patron, Duane Wilson, then purchased the retired base from the federal government for the sum of $1.00 on behalf of the new Jackson Heights school district.   With a few minor modifications, the command center became a high school and opened for classes in August 1969.

In 1975, the construction of a second building was completed to accommodate the district's elementary and middle school students.

The name of the school district was changed from Jackson Heights to North Jackson.

With the passage of a $3 million bond issue on November 13, 2007, the construction of new classrooms and overall facilities improvements began at Jackson Heights High School. This was the first major renovation since the school's opening and relocates middle school classrooms into the high school building.  After construction, the former underground classrooms became a storage area.

Schools
The school district operates the following schools:
 Jackson Heights High School and Middle School
 Jackson Heights Elementary School

See also
 Holton USD 336 - school district south of USD 335 in Holton
 List of unified school districts in Kansas
 List of high schools in Kansas

References

External links
 

School districts in Kansas
Schools in Jackson County, Kansas
1969 establishments in Kansas
Educational institutions established in 1969